Haus Labs by Lady Gaga (or simply Haus Labs; formerly known as Haus Laboratories) is an American vegan and cruelty-free cosmetics brand founded by Lady Gaga. First launched on September 17, 2019, it was the first major beauty line to launch exclusively on Amazon as a retailer partner, and released in nine countries including France, Germany, Japan, the United Kingdom, and the United States. Haus Labs relaunched on June 9, 2022 with new retail partner Sephora. The company advertises its products as "supercharged clean artistry makeup powered by innovation."

Haus Laboratories was originally launched in 2012 as a perfume brand, in association with Coty Inc., an American multinational beauty company founded in 1904, and known for owning several brands. Their first fragrance, Fame, came out in that same year,  while the second one, Eau de Gaga, in 2014.

History

Background
Between 2012 and 2014, Gaga released two fragrances, Fame and Eau de Gaga, via Haus Laboratories in association with Coty, Inc.

In February 2018, Gaga filed for trademarks for "Haus Beauty" and "Haus Labs" through her company, Ate My Heart Inc. Then, at the Met Gala in May 2019, fans started to suspect that the makeup she was using was a preview of what was to come. Besides that, she had been using the hashtag #HausBeauty on several posts on her Instagram. Haus Laboratories is Gaga's first solo cosmetics brand. Previously, she had collaborated with MAC Cosmetics, for their Viva Glam Lipstick 2011 campaign, with a video directed by Nick Knight.

The brand is inspired by Gaga's early days as a musician in Manhattan and it carries the spirit of embrace of individuality, and expressing it through bold makeup and body art, authenticity, and inclusivity. Also, the decision to sell it on Amazon was based on Haus Labs' messages of self-acceptance and confidence. Gaga stated in an interview to The Business of Fashion that the partnership with Amazon was made because only they would allow her to commercialize a brand with these principles, saying "no message of self-acceptance, no deal".

The team assembled by Gaga consists of 15 people, such as veterans from Milk Makeup and Benefit Cosmetics owned by LVMH; Gaga's makeup artist, Sarah Tanno, who is the brand's global artistry director; and the former executive at The Honest Company and Zynga, a mobile game company behind FarmVille and Words with Friends, Ben Jones, who is chief executive. She has also secured backing from Lightspeed Venture Partners, an investor in companies including Goop and Stitch Fix.

Beauty line launch (2019–2022)
Haus Labs' first products were available for pre-order for Amazon Prime members and through the company website hauslabs.com on July 15, 2019, but only hit the market in September. For the official launch, Gaga hosted a party, called "Haus Party", with 500 guests, on September 16, 2019, in Santa Monica. During her speech, she claimed "we're not just launching makeup. This is a glamour attack on the world to be accepting, humble, brave and, above all, empowered to be kind. No matter how you identify, all are welcome at Haus Laboratories". It was launched simultaneously on Amazon in nine countries, including the US, France, and Germany, while customers from other locations could order from the company's global store, on hauslabs.com. The first products included lip liner, lip gloss, and liquid-to-powder shimmer.

Rebranding (2022–Present)
In 2022, Haus Labs renamed itself as Haus Labs by Lady Gaga from Haus Laboratories as part of its rebranding campaign, which also consisted of a relaunch of the brand on June 9 for which it partnered with Sephora as its retail outlet. The first round of products became available at select outlets, with plans to roll out to over 500 outlets across the United States and Canada in fall. According to Gaga, 2,700 "dirty" ingredients were removed during the rebranding process, replaced with beneficial ingredients like hyaluronic acid and vegan collagen.

The brand announced Nicole Sokol as its Vice President  in November as part of their rebranding campaign. Sokol was appointed to focus on product strategy, product development, merchandising and product design.

Business

Marketing
Serving as the launch video of the brand, a one-minute video titled "Our Haus. Your Rules." was released. It was directed by Daniel Sannwald and featured Gaga encouraging people to embrace the individuality and express it through bold makeup and body art with her collection of makeup. "Babylon" (Haus Labs version) was its official track, being produced by Gaga in collaboration with Bloodpop, Tchami, and Boys Noize. Promoting part 1 of the Cosmic Love Holiday Collection, Haus Labs released a video featuring Gaga along with other models wearing the new products. On May 18, 2020, the brand released a video with Gaga accompanied by guests such as RuPaul's Drag Race All Stars season 2 winner Alaska Thunderfuck, RuPaul's Drag Race season 10 winner Aquaria, and the YouTubers Aaliyah Jay and Patrick Starrr among others, to lip sync "Stupid Love", while promoting the eye shadow palette of the same name. On July 31, 2020, a video featuring Gaga was released to promote their gel pencil eyeliners, named Eye-Dentify.

Sales
According to reports by the  fashion-industry trade journal, WWD, Haus Labs was the third best selling celebrity makeup brand of 2020, earning over $141.7 million of media value (a measure of marketing success). It was only behind Fenty Beauty and Kylie Cosmetics, as first and second place, respectively.

Products 
On September 17, 2019, Haus Laboratories launched the first products, six kits that featured three products each: Glam Attack (a shimmer pigment), R.I.P. Lip Liner, and Le Riot Lip Gloss. Inspired by the houses in the ball culture scene in the 1980s, seen in the documentary Paris Is Burning (1990) and in the television series Pose, these kits were called Haus of Chained Ballerina, Haus of Goddess, Haus of Bitch, Haus of Rockstar, Haus of Dynasty, and Haus of Metal Head. They also released a limited-edition packs of two pigments, two glosses, or two liners. On November 14, the line announced that they would be launching their first holiday collection, entitled Cosmic Love, with a new formula and more glittered lip liners, lip gloss, and shimmer powders, and a new kit called the Haus of Angel Baby, along with their first ever bullet lipstick. It was released on November 18.

On May 19, 2020, Haus Labs launched the Stupid Love Palette, with 18 new shades, with names from Gaga's sixth studio album Chromatica (2020). Named Eye-Dentify, on August 4, 2020, the brand released their new collection of gel pencil eyeliners, made into 20 different shades and available in three different finishes – matte, shimmer, and metallic. Both Gaga and Ariana Grande wore it in the music video for "Rain On Me". On October 6, 2020, Haus Labs launched a blush and highlighter duo – Head Rush, and a bronzing and highlighter duo – Heat Spell. The blush comes in seven duo sets, and the bronzer comes in five. In an interview with Refinery29, Gaga stated "we formulated them to be a silky powder, that leaves a clean buildable finish with rich, flirtatious hues and beaming highlighters. I've named them Heat Spell and Head Rush to indicate the ecstasy of celebrating you."

As part of the celebration of the tenth anniversary of Born This Way, on June 8, 2021, Haus Labs released the Bad Kid Vault, a limited-edition makeup box set including 16 products, such as eyeliners, lip crayons, lipglosses and a red sparkle lipstick. The brand also launched the Be Kind. Be Brave. Be You. Bundle, which includes Gaga's anthology book, Channel Kindness: Stories of Kindness and Community and three more lip crayons. On September 28, Haus Labs released the Love for Sale Eyeshadow Palette, which consists of 18 shades and was inspired by her second collaborative album with Tony Bennett, Love for Sale (2021).

In Fall 2022, the brand launched their first line of complexion products, introducing the Triclone Skin Tech liquid foundation line. Including 51 shades, the Triclone line had one of the most expansive and inclusive array of shades for a cosmetic company's selection in their first release. Besides that, Haus Labs has every makeup category covered, from complexion, to eye, lip, and cheek.

Awards 
Haus Laboratories won the award for Best New Brand at the 2020 Allure Readers' Choice Awards, while the Edge Precision Brow Pencil was awarded for Best Brow Pencil in the category of Best Eye Makeup Products of 2021 at its annual Best of Beauty Awards.

Philanthropy 
Haus Laboratories joined the Born This Way Foundation, a non-profit organization founded in 2012 by Gaga and her mother to raise mental health awareness, through donations from $1 of every paid transaction on Haus Labs' official website, while the same amount from every purchase of the Love for Sale Eyeshadow Palette would be donated to Tony Bennett's charity, Exploring the Arts, founded in 1999.

See also 
 Lady Gaga Fame
 Eau de Gaga

References 

Cosmetics brands
Lady Gaga
Organizations established in 2019